Ahron Villena (born Roche Ahron Villena on March 10, 1987) is a Filipino actor. He was formerly a member of ABS-CBN's circle of homegrown talents Star Magic and is currently a freelance artist.

Career
In 2004, he joined and won the ABS-CBN noontime show MTB: Ang Saya-Saya's talent search called TV Idol Ur D’''' on August 21, 2004. Since then, he has appeared in local television dramas, anthology series and movies.

In 2010, he moved from ABS-CBN's rival station GMA Network to join Survivor Philippines: Celebrity Showdown. He currently serves as a Sangguniang Kabataan's Chairman in Brgy. San Jose Sico, Batangas City. Villena attends the Trinity University of Asia in Quezon City with fellow actors Megan Young, Alfred Navarro, Che Tolentino, Charles Christianson, Kontin Roque, Sugar Mercado, Sophia Montecarlo, Erich Gonzales, Alvin Aragon, Eslove Briones, Shey Bustamante, Joe Vargas and Marco Aytona. After Survivor Philippines'', he went back to ABS-CBN but has since left the talent management and remains a freelancer.

Filmography

Film

Television

External links 
 

1987 births
Living people
People from Batangas City
Male actors from Batangas
Filipino male child actors
Filipino male film actors
Filipino male television actors
Filipino male models
Star Magic
Participants in Philippine reality television series
Survivor Philippines contestants
Reality show winners
ABS-CBN personalities
GMA Network personalities
TV5 (Philippine TV network) personalities